The phrase "a nation of shopkeepers", commonly attributed to Napoleon, is a reference to England or the United Kingdom.

Attribution to Napoleon
There is reason to doubt that Napoleon ever used it.  No contemporaneous French newspaper mentions that he did.  The phrase was first used in an offensive sense by the French revolutionary Bertrand Barère de Vieuzac on 11 June 1794 in a speech to the National Convention: "Let Pitt then boast of his victory to his nation of shopkeepers".  Later, during the Napoleonic wars, the British press mentioned the phrase, attributing it either to "the French" or to Napoleon himself.  

A later, explicit source is Barry Edward O'Meara, who was surgeon to Napoleon during his exile in St. Helena.  If O'Meara is to be believed, Napoleon said:

  There may be grounds to doubt the veracity of this account.

The supposed French original as uttered by Napoleon (une nation de boutiquiers) is frequently cited, but it has no attestation.  O'Meara routinely conversed with Napoleon in Italian, not French.  There is no other source.

After the war English newspapers sometimes tried to correct the impression.  For example the following article appeared in the Morning Post of 28 May 1832:
ENGLAND A NATION OF SHOPKEEPERS
This complimentary term, for so we must consider it, as applied to a Nation which has derived its principal prosperity from its commercial greatness, has been erroneously attributed, from time to time, to all the leading Revolutionists of France.  To our astonishment we now find it applied exclusively to BONAPARTE.  Than this nothing can be further from the fact.  NAPOLEON was scarcely known at the time, he being merely an Officer of inferior rank, totally unconnected with politics.  The occasion on which that splenetic, but at the same time, complimentary observation was made was that of the ever-memorable battle of the 1st of June.  The oration delivered on that occasion was by M. BARRERE [sic], in which, after describing our beautiful country as one "on which the sun scarce designs to shed its light", he described England as a nation of shopkeepers.

Historical context
Napoleon would have been correct in seeing the United Kingdom as essentially a commercial and naval rather than a land based power, but during his lifetime  it was fast being transformed from a mercantile to an industrial nation, a process which laid the basis for a century of British hegemony after the Battle of Waterloo.  Although the UK had half the population of France during the Napoleonic Wars,  there was a higher per capita income and, consequently, a greater tax base, necessary to conduct a prolonged war of attrition.  The United Kingdom's economy and its ability to finance the war against Napoleon also benefitted from the Bank of England's issuance of inconvertible banknotes, a "temporary" measure which remained from the 1790s until 1821.

Origin of phrase
The phrase may have been part of standard 18th-century economic dialogue.  It has been suggested that Napoleon may have heard it during a meeting of the French Convention on 11 June 1794, when Bertrand Barère de Vieuzac quoted Smith's phrase.  But this presupposes that Napoleon himself, as opposed to Barère alone, used the phrase.

In any case the phrase did not originate with Napoleon, or even Barère.  It first appears in a non-pejorative sense in The Wealth of Nations (1776) by Adam Smith, who wrote: 

Smith is also quoted as saying that Britain was "a nation that is governed by shopkeepers", which is how he put it in the first (1776) edition.  It is unlikely that either Adam Smith or Napoleon used the phrase to describe that class of small retailers who would not even have had the franchise.

The phrase has also been attributed to Samuel Adams, but this is disputed; Josiah Tucker, Dean of Gloucester, produced a slightly different phrase in 1766:

Benjamin Franklin used a similar idea about Holland in a letter to Charles W. F. Dumas on 6 August 1781:

Notes

References
Fernand Braudel, 1982. The Perspective of the World vol III of Civilization & Capitalism, 15th–18th Century
 The Oxford Dictionary of Quotations, 1979, Oxford University Press.
 The Oxford Dictionary of Political Quotations, 2004.  

Napoleonic Wars
Political quotes
1780s neologisms
British culture
Cultural depictions of British people